The legislative districts of Misamis were the representations of the historical province of Misamis in the various national legislatures of the Philippines until 1931. The undivided province's representation encompassed what are now the provinces of Camiguin, Misamis Occidental and Misamis Oriental, and the highly urbanized city of Cagayan de Oro.

History
Misamis was initially represented in the lower house of the Philippine Legislature through two assembly districts. When seats for the upper house of the Philippine Legislature were elected from territory-based districts between 1916 and 1935, the province formed part of the eleventh senatorial district which elected two out of the 24-member Senate.

In February 1921 the enactment of Act No. 2968 or the "Artadi Law" enlarged the province of Misamis southward with the annexation of northern areas of Bukidnon: the municipal districts of Claveria and Napaliran were annexed to Balingasag and became part of the first district; the municipal district of Lourdes (also spelled Lourdez), along with areas around the middle stretches of the Iponan and Cagayan rivers, were annexed to Cagayan de Misamis and became part of the second district. Executive Order No. 74 issued on 22 August 1927 re-constituted Claveria and Lourdes into separate municipal districts, and also created two new municipal districts: Taglimao (the area in the middle reaches of the Iponan River) and Lumbia (middle reaches of the Cagayan River).

On 2 November 1929 the Philippine Legislature approved Act No. 3537 which divided Misamis into two new provinces with effect on 1 January 1930. Per Section 6 of the said law the incumbent Misamis first district and second district assemblymen were to represent Misamis Oriental and Misamis Occidental respectively. The two successor provinces first elected their separate lower house representatives in the 1931 elections.

1st District (defunct)

1907–1922
Municipalities: Balingasag, Mambajao, Tagoloan, Talisayan, Gingoog (re-established 1907), Sagay (re-established 1909), Catarman (re-established 1911), Salay (established 1919)

1922–1931
Municipalities: Balingasag, Catarman, Gingoog, Mambajao, Sagay, Salay, Tagoloan, Talisayan, Claveria (former municipal district of Bukidnon, annexed to Balingasag 1921; re-established as municipal district 1927), Napaliran (former municipal district of Bukidnon, annexed to Balingasag 1921), Quinoguitan (Kinogitan) (established 1929)

2nd District (defunct)

1907–1922
Municipalities: Cagayan, Initao, Jimenez, Misamis, Oroquieta, Plaridel (Langaran), Baliangao (re-established 1910), Aloran (re-established 1916), Clarin (Loculan) (re-established 1920), Tudela (established 1920)

1922–1931
Municipalities: Aloran, Baliangao, Cagayan, Clarin, Initao, Jimenez, Misamis, Oroquieta, Plaridel, Tudela, Lourdes (former municipal district of Bukidnon, annexed to Cagayan 1921; re-established as municipal district 1927), Lumbia (former unorganized territory of Bukidnon, annexed to Cagayan 1921; established as separate municipal district 1927; merged with Taglimao 1930), Taglimao (former unorganized territory of Bukidnon, annexed to Cagayan 1921; established as separate municipal district 1927; annexed to Lumbia 1930), Lopez Jaena (established 1929), Tangub (Regidor) (established 1930)

See also
Legislative district of Misamis Occidental
Legislative district of Misamis Oriental
Legislative district of Camiguin
Legislative districts of Cagayan de Oro

References

Misamis